Kamlah Fort (also: Kamlahgarh or Kamlah Garh, from Hindi गढ़ (Garh): "fort") is a 17th-century fort located near Kamlah village in the province of Himachal Pradesh, India west of Mandi. It was probably constructed in 1625 by Raja Suraj Sen of Mandi.  

The Mandi kingdom depended on its forts for its security, and Kamlah Fort had the reputation of being the most secure repository of the reputed 360 forts of the Mandi state from the rule of Suraj Sen to that of Ishvari Sen (1788–1826). Maharaja Ranjit Singh attacked the fort in 1830. It was destroyed in 1840 and then retaken a few years later and reconstructed by Mandi Kings.

See also 
 Forts in India
 Sarkaghat Mandi district
 Rulers of Siokot and Mandi
 Suket State
 Raja

References

Further reading 

 

Forts in Himachal Pradesh
17th-century forts in India
Buildings and structures in Mandi district